London Buses route 521 is a Transport for London contracted bus route in London, England. Running between Waterloo and London Bridge stations, it is operated by London General. It is also one of two Red Arrow branded services. In 2016, it became the first battery electric bus route in London, along with route 507.

History 

Route 521 commenced operating on 18 July 1992 as part of the Red Arrow network of bus routes aimed at commuters in Central London linking some of the capital's main railway termini.

On 2 June 2002, along with route 507, the route was the first bus route in London to be converted to articulated bus with Mercedes-Benz O530G Citaros.

During late 2003, early 2004, a series of onboard fires on Mercedes-Benz O530Gs led to withdrawal of the entire fleet, while Mercedes-Benz made some modifications. During this period limited services operated using a variety of different buses on route 521.

In September 2009, as part of the move to replace London's articulated buses, the O530Gs were replaced by Mercedes-Benz O530 Citaros.

Another criticism of articulated buses was the low number of seats, with only 49 per vehicle. A standard rigid Citaro has 44 seats, however the new ones for route 521 have just 21, with room supposedly for up to 76 standers, leading to criticism the new buses were "cattle trucks" and even more crowded than the buses they replaced.

In December 2013, two trial BYD electric buses were introduced. In September 2016, Alexander Dennis Enviro 200 bodied BYD electric buses began to operate the route, making it and route 521 the first battery electric bus routes in London. In September 2016, the buses on this route and on the 507 have received new digital route displays.

In 2021, the frequency of the service at peak times was halved from 24 buses per hour to 12.

Future withdrawal
On 23 November 2022, it was announced that route 521 would be withdrawn following a consultation, with routes 59 and 133 being rerouted to replace it either side of St Paul's. These changes will be implemented by the end of 2023.

Current route

Route 521 operates via these primary locations:
Waterloo station  
South Bank Waterloo Bridge
Aldwych (To Waterloo only. Buses to London Bridge skip Aldwych stops via the Strand Underpass, before calling at Holborn)
Holborn station 
Chancery Lane station 
Holborn Circus
City Thameslink station 
St Paul's station 
Mansion House station 
Cannon Street station  
Monument station 
London Bridge
London Bridge bus station  for London Bridge station

References

External links

Timetable

Bus routes in London
Transport in the London Borough of Camden
Transport in the London Borough of Southwark
Transport in the City of London
Transport in the City of Westminster